Friedrich "Fritz" Berber (born 27 November 1898 in Marburg, Germany; died 23 October 1984 in Kreuth, Germany) was a member of the Nazi administration in Germany up until 1943, after which he worked, on secondment, for International Red Cross in Geneva.

Before World War II, Berber studied at Woodbrooke College, a Quaker study centre in Birmingham, England.

Fritz Berber joined the Nazi party in 1937. He was also a member of the National Socialist German Lecturers League and the National Socialist Association of Legal Professionals.

He was denounced by members of the Nazi party as a liberal, but was protected by Joachim Von Ribbentrop, who valued his knowledge of Great Britain. After the war, he became professor of International Law at Munich.

References 

1898 births
1984 deaths
People from Marburg
Nazi Party members
Red Cross personnel